The Nanjemoy Formation is a geologic formation pertaining to both the Wilcox Group and the Pamunkey Group of the eastern United States, stretching across the states of Virginia, Maryland, and District of Columbia. The formation crops out east of the Appalachians and dates back to the Paleogene period. Specifically to the Ypresian stage of the Eocene epoch, about 55 to 50 Ma or Wasatchian in the NALMA classification, defined by the contemporaneous Wasatch Formation of the Pacific US coast.

The about  thin formation crops out in a narrow irregular band and only in certain of the many creeks of the Maryland peninsula and on the southern side of the Potomac River in Virginia. The two members the formation was divided into by Clark and Martin in 1901; Potapaco and Woodstock, represent different phases in the basin history. The lower Potapaco Member is much more clayey, described as marl, than the upper Woodstock Member, probably characteristic of less storm influences in the shallow shelf sediments.

The formation has provided a wealth of fossils of mainly fish, but also mammals, reptiles, birds and flora. The presence of the sharks Otodus obliquus and Carcharocles aksuaticus, as well as various other shark and ray species are notable. Crocodylian, snake, turtle, mammal, and bird remains have all been found in the Nanjemoy Formation.

Etymology 

Nanjemoy is probably an Ojibwe word, meaning "one goes downward", representing the many rivers and creeks in the wet watershed of Chesapeake Bay, an area originally inhabited by the Algonquin-speaking Nanticoke and Powhatan. The formation is named after Nanjemoy Creek, a left tributary of the Potomac River.

Wicomico is the name of two separate rivers, one on Maryland's Eastern Shore, Wicomico River (Maryland eastern shore), and another in Southern Maryland, Wicomico River (Potomac River tributary), and is the name of a small thoroughfare in southeastern Charles County.

The reason this term appears in three different places in the state simply means that the people living there when the English barged in were trying to tell them it was a nice place to live.

Wigh or wik, representing "pleasant" and accomico "dwelling, village" was the native's way of telling the Europeans they liked living there.

Potapaco was an early name for Port Tobacco Creek, that was named after the people, also known as the Piscataway.

Nanjemoy, which may contain elements of Ojibwa, by contrast means "one goes downward."

Mattawoman, found in Charles, Prince George's and on the Eastern Shore, has remnants of not only Algonquin, but Fox and Ojibwa as well, and translates to "where one goes pleasantly."

Definition 

The Nanjemoy Formation was defined by Clark and Martin in 1901, as part of the mapping by the Maryland Geological Survey. The Nanjemoy Formation was divided into two members, the lower or Potapaco, and the upper or Woodstock. The main lithologic distinction is that the lower part of the Nanjemoy is much clayey than the upper part. In the subsurface, the distinction between the members is less evident than in outcrops, especially in Maryland, so the formation has been left undivided.

Extent 

The Nanjemoy Formation, represented as Tn on the geologic map of the Washington West 30' × 60' Quadrangle, Maryland, Virginia, and Washington D.C., restricted to the southeastern side of the Potomac Basin represented in the quadrangle. Scott (2005) in his thesis included a map showing the thin bands of outcrops of both the underlying Marlboro Clay and the Nanjemoy Formation, restricted to the many creeks feeding the Chesapeake Bay.

The Nanjemoy Formation (Eocene), the Marlboro Clay (Paleocene), and the Aquia Formation (Paleocene) are present in the westernmost part of the Potomac channel.

The outcrop area of the formation is designated Nanjemoy Wildlife Management Area.

Geology 

Geologically, the area of deposition of the Nanjemoy Formation is part of the Atlantic coastal plain province.

Potomac Basin 

The Potomac Basin represents the central part of the Atlantic coastal plain that stretches along the Atlantic coast of Canada and the United States. The basin stretches across parts of four states (Maryland, Pennsylvania, Virginia and West Virginia), as well as the District of Columbia. This area is also called the Potomac watershed. It includes all of the land area where water drains towards the mouth of the Potomac – the point where the river spills into the Chesapeake Bay. The Potomac River basin is the 2nd largest watershed in the Chesapeake Bay watershed.

Land
The drainage area of the Potomac includes 14,670 square miles in four states: Virginia (5,723 sq. mi.), Maryland (3,818 sq. mi.), West Virginia (3,490 sq. mi.), Pennsylvania (1,570 sq. mi.), and the District of Columbia (69 sq. mi.). The basin’s total area varies depending on map projection used. The basin lies in five geological provinces: the Appalachian Plateau, the Ridge and Valley, Blue Ridge, Piedmont Plateau, and Coastal Plain. The Potomac meanders over 383 miles from Fairfax Stone, West Virginia to Point Lookout, Maryland. The river’s distance will vary with map projection and location of measuring tool in the river (ie. middle of the river, Maryland shoreline, Virginia shoreline).

Based on information from the NLCD 2011 database, the majority of the basin’s land area is covered by forests at 54.6 percent of the land area. Developed land makes up 14.1 percent of the basin’s land area, while agriculture covers 26.0 percent. Water and wetlands make up 5.9 percent of the basin’s land area.

The Potomac's major tributaries include: the Anacostia River, Antietam Creek, the Cacapon River, Catoctin Creek, Conococheague Creek, the Monocacy River, the North Branch, the South Branch, the Occoquan River, the Savage River, the Seneca Creek, and the Shenandoah River.

People
The population of the basin is approximately 6.11 million (2010 estimated census). The population has increased by about five percent since 2005. The following information is based on 2010 estimated census data.

Stratigraphy 

The Nanjemoy Formation belongs to two geologic groups; the Wilcox Group of the Gulf of Mexico Basin in the southernmost surface expression of the formation and the Pamunkey Group in the northern and central portions from Maryland in the north through Virginia and the Carolinas. Both geologic groups have been dated to the early Paleogene; the Paleocene and Eocene periods, or in the commonly used NALMA classification; Wasatchian, defined by the age-equivalent Wasatch Formation of Wyoming.

The third-oldest unit in the Pamunkey Group is the Nanjemoy Formation that overlies the Marlboro Clay and is partly overlain by the Piney Point Formation and in many areas covered by the Miocene Calvert Formation, separated by an unconformity representing about 34 Ma.

Petrology 
The formation comprises glauconitic quartz sand, dark-grayish-green to olive-black (tan to orange where weathered), fine to medium-grained; and dark-greenish-gray silty clay. In places, the sand is very muddy or contains many small quartz pebbles, and the clay is silty or sandy. Both lithologies contain richly fossiliferous beds including abundant mollusk shells.

Robert E. Weems and Gary J. Grimsley (1999) described the geology of the Fisher/Sullivan site in Virginia as:

Paleogeography

Climate 

The climate of the Early Eocene and Late Paleocene was very hot and rich in CO2. This enormous size could only have been possible under the most ideal conditions for such large species, around 6 to 8 Ma after the extinction of the previous megafauna; the dinosaurs. The climate of the Neotropical biome was estimated at  average yearly temperatures and 2000 ppm atmospheric CO2.

Depositional environment 
The depositional environment of the Nanjemoy Formation is mostly shallow shelf. The more clayey beds suggest an area or time of quiet water, not affected by waves, tides, or current activity; intercalated sandier zones may reflect the higher energy of waves or currents during episodic storms. Its regional dip is eastward at 15–20 ft per mile (3-3.5 m/km).

Paleontology 
The floral and faunal assemblage of the Nanjemoy Formation is very varied and provides an insight into the paleobiological and paleoclimatological environment of the early Eocene. Fossils of bivalves, sharks, rays, actinopterygian fishes, reptiles, birds and mammals, and of fruits and seeds are common in the Potapaco Member. More than 2000 vertebrate coprolites from the Potapaco Member at the Fisher/Sullivan Site in Virginia were analyzed by Dentzien Dias et al. (2019). The chemical composition (phosphatic), inclusions and morphology suggest that only carnivorous scats were preserved.

All Nanjemoy coprolites were produced by fishes; chondrichthyans, Carcharhiniformes, and lamniform sharks, probably the genus Carcharias. Other morphotypes were produced by actinopterygian fishes. The surface marks and the lack of flatness on most coprolites suggests early lithification of the Potapaco Member.

Main fossil sites of the Nanjemoy Formation are
 Nanjemoy Creek; Charles County, MD
 Woodstock; King George County, VA
 Fisher/Sullivan; Stafford County, VA
 Evergreen Plantation; Prince Charles County, VA

Fisher/Sullivan site, VA 
In October 1990, Mr. Richard Brezina of the Maryland Geological Society discovered an important fossil site east of Fredericksburg, in eastern Stafford County, Virginia. This locality, along an unnamed tributary of Muddy Creek, became known as the Fisher/Sullivan site in recognition of its principle landowners.

Mr. Brezina immediately realized that the site was exceptional, because it yielded numerous shark teeth and other vertebrate remains from the sands and gravels in the unnamed tributary. Mr. Brezina notified other members of the Maryland Geological Society, and together members of the MGS began to screen stream sediments at the site for more shark teeth and other remains. It soon became apparent, from the types of teeth that were being found and from the color and texture of the sediments in the banks of the creek, that the fossils were being reworked from glauconitic ("greensand") horizons of the Lower Tertiary (Paleocene-Eocene) Pamunkey Group.

Because the Pamunkey Group previously had yielded only sparse vertebrate remains, it seemed reasonable to suspect that this locality was scientifically important.

Fossil content 
Among many invertebrates (gastropods, bivalves, corals, bryozoans), the following fossils have been reported from the Nanjemoy Formation:

Contemporaneous fossiliferous units 

Ypresian, Wasatchian and Casamayoran formations:

North America
 Manasquan Formation, New Jersey
 Bashi Formation, Alabama
 Hatchetigbee Bluff and Sabinetown Bluff Formations, Southeastern United States
 Klondike Mountain Formation, Republic & Curlew Basin, Washington State
 Crescent Formation, Washington
 Allenby and Coldwater Beds Formations and Ootsa Lake and Kamloops Group, British Columbia
 Lookingglass and Umpqua Formations, Oregon
 Wasatch Formation, and Tatman, Willwood, Wind River, Pass Peak and Indian Meadows Formations, Wyoming
 Challis Volcanics Formation, Idaho
 Golden Valley Formation, North Dakota
 Claron Formation, Utah
 Green River Formation, western United States
 Coalmont, Cuchara and DeBeque Formations, Colorado
 Sheep Pass Formation, Nevada
 San Jose and Galisteo Formations, New Mexico
 Capay, Juncal, Llajas, Maniobra, Matilija, Meganos & Santa Susana Formations, California
 Margaret Formation, Northwest Territories and Nunavut, Canada
 Mokka Fiord Formation, Remus Basin, Northern Territories
 Bateque and Las Tetas de Cabra Formations, Baja California
 Hannold Hill and Pendleton Ferry Formations, Gulf of Mexico
 Adjuntas and Indio Formations and Lechería Limestone, Mexico
 Descartes Formation, Costa Rica
 Stettin Formation, Jamaica
 Scotland Formation, Barbados
 Lizard Springs Formation, Trinidad and Tobago

South America
 Bogotá Formation, Altiplano Cundiboyacense, Colombia
 Cerrejón Formation, Cesar-Ranchería Basin, Colombia
 Los Cuervos Formation, Catatumbo, Cesar-Ranchería and Llanos Basins, Colombia
 Caballas Formation, Pisco Basin, Peru
 Chacras and Negritos Formations, Peru
 Fonseca Formation, Brazil
 Itaboraí Formation, Itaboraí Basin, Brazil
 Lumbrera Formation, Salta Basin, Argentina
 Laguna del Hunco Formation, Cañadón Asfalto Basin, Argentina
 Huitrera Formation, Neuquén Basin, Argentina
 Sarmiento and Ventana Formations, Golfo San Jorge Basin, Argentina
 Las Flores Formation, Austral Basin, Argentina

Antarctica
 lower La Meseta Formation

Europe
 Kortrijk Clay, Bruxellian Formation and Dormaal Member of Tienen Formation, Belgium
 Sables de Pierrefonds, Calcares marins à alvéolines, Lignites de Soissonais, Marnes de Foncouverte, Argiles d'lignite du Soissonnais, Marnes de Gan and Carcassonne Group, France
 Moler, Ølst and Fur Formations, southeastern North Sea Graben, Denmark
 Balder Formation, Faroe-Shetland Basin, North Sea
 London Clay, Bagshot Formation, London Basin, England
 Oldhaven Formation, England
 Roterzschicht Formation, Austria
 Lefkara Formation, Cyprus
 Silveirinha Formation, Portugal
 Armàncies, Corca and Roda Formations, Spain
 Pesciara Formation, Italy
 , Monte Bolca, Italy

Asia
 Çeltek, Kirkkavak and Yoncali Formations, Turkey
 Umm al-Rua’us Formation, Saudi Arabia
 Alai Beds, Kyrgyzstan
 Ghazij, Mami Khel and Shekhan Formations, Pakistan
 Cambay Shale, Naredi and Subathu Formations, Sylhet Limestone and Upper Ranikot Group, India
 Dabu, Qimugen Formation and Ulunguhe Formations, Xinjiang, China
 Arshanto Formation, Inner Mongolia, China
 Yangxi Formation, Hubei, China
 Lingcha Formation, Hunan, China
 Wutu Formation, Shandong, China
 Tadushi Formation, Primorsky Krai, Russia
 Takaradayskaya Formation, Sakhalin, Russia
 Ommai Formation, Kamchatka, Russia
 Akasaki Formation, Japan

Africa
 Esna, El Rufuf Formation and Thebes Formations, Egypt
 Al Jir and Jdeir Formations, Libya
 Gafsa Phosphates Formation, Tunisia
 Ait Ouarhitane Formation, Morocco
 Tamaguélelt Formation, Mali
 Thies Formation, Senegal
 Auradu Formation, Somalia
 Landana Formation, Cabinda, Angola

Oceania
 Red Bluff Tuff Formation, Tutuiri Greensand and Tumaio and Te Whanga Limestones, New Zealand
 Macquarie Harbor Formation, Tasmania, Australia
 Dilwyn Formation, Victoria
 Redbank Plains Formation, Queensland
 Jubilee Member of Cardabia Formation, Western Australia

See also 

Regional geology
 List of fossiliferous stratigraphic units in Maryland, Virginia
 Geology of Chesapeake Bay, Appalachians
 Chesapeake Bay impact crater

Paleontology
 North American land mammal ages
 Bumbanian, Casamayoran, Mangaorapan, Waipawan
 Paleontology in Maryland, Virginia
 Princeton Chert
 Barylambda

References

Bibliography 
Nanjemoy
 
 

Potomac Basin

Geology publications

Paleontology publications

Further reading 
 

Ancient publications
 R. E. Weems. 1985. Vertebrate biozones of the Pamunkey Group (Paleocene and Eocene, Maryland and Virginia). Stratigraphy and paleontology of the outcropping Tertiary beds in the Pamunkey River region, central Virginia Coastal Plain—Guidebook for Atlantic Coastal Plain Geological Association 1984 field Trip: Atlantic Coastal Plain Geological Association 198-209
 R. Weems and S. Horman. 1983. Teleost fish remains (Osteoglossidae, Blochiidae, Scombridae, Triodontidae, Diodontidae) from the Lower Eocene Nanjemoy Formation of Maryland. Proceedings of The Biological Society of Washington 96(1):38-49
 K. V. Palmer and D. C. Brann. 1965. Catalogue of the Paleocene and Eocene molluscs of the southern and eastern United States. Part 1. Pelecypoda, Amphineura, Peteropoda, Scaphopoda and Cephalopoda. Bulletins of American Paleontology 48:1-471
 S.F. Blake. 1941. Note on a vertebra of Palaeophis from the Eocene of Maryland. Journal of the Washington Academy of Sciences 31(12):501-503
 W. B. Clark and G. C. Martin. 1901. Mollusca. Maryland Geological Survey, Eocene 122-203
 C. R. Eastman. 1901. Pisces. Maryland Geological Survey Eocene 98-115
 W. B. Clark. 1895. Contributions to the Eocene fauna of the Middle Atlantic slope. Johns Hopkins University Circulars 15(121):3-6

Geologic formations of the United States
Geologic formations of Maryland
Geologic formations of Virginia
Paleogene Maryland
Paleogene geology of Virginia
Ypresian Stage
Wasatchian
Sandstone formations
Shale formations
Limestone formations
Shallow marine deposits
Formations
Paleontology in Maryland
Paleontology in Virginia
Formations
Formations